Sir Geoffrey de Melville, Lord of Melville, Sheriff of Edinburgh, Justiciar of Lothian was a 12th-century Scottish noble.

Life
Melville is known to be acting as Sheriff of Edinburgh in 1153 during the reign of King Malcolm IV of Scotland. Geoffrey was also joint Justiciar of Lothian from 1170 during the reign of King William I of Scotland.

Marriage and issue
His spouse was known at his death as Matilda Malherbe. He is known to have had the following known issue:
Gregory de Melville (died 1178), had issue.
Phillip de Melville, had issue.
Geoffrey de Melville
Thomas de Melville
Robert de Melville
Hugh de Melville
Richard de Melville
Walter de Melville, had issue.

Notes

Citations

References

 

Year of birth unknown
Year of death unknown
12th-century Scottish people
Medieval Scottish knights